Skull Bearers may refer to:

Skull Bearers (Shannara), fictional creatures in the Shannara series of epic fantasy novels
Kapalika means "Bearer of the Skull bowl" in Hindu culture